Futūh al-Buldān, or Kitāb Futūḥ al-Buldān("Book of the Conquest of the Countries/Lands"), is the best known work by the 9th century Arab or Persian historian Ahmad Ibn Yahya al-Baladhuri of Abbasid-era Baghdad.

Written in Arabic, the Kitāb Futūḥ al-Buldān is a  digest of a larger lost work of geographical history of the Caliphate empire, the political histories and events leading to the inclusion of the locations within it, including accounts of the early conquests of the Islamic prophet Muhammad and the early caliphs'.

Al-Baladhuri travelled widely in regions of northern Syria and Mesopotamia, collecting traditions for material to include in his book. He also translated some Persian texts into Arabic.

Editions 
Futūḥ al-Buldān was edited by M. J. de Goeje as Liber expugnationis regionum (Leiden, 1870; Cairo, 1901).

An English edition with the title "The Origins of the Islamic State" was published in two parts by Columbia University Press; vol. 1, translated by Philip Khuri Hitti (1916) and vol. 2, translated by Francis Clark Murgotten (1924).

References

External links

9th-century history books
History books about Islam